The Munich Ravens are an American football team based in Munich, Germany. The team starts in the 2023 season in the European League of Football (ELF).

History 
The entry of the newly founded franchise into the professional ELF league was announced in August 2022. However, no name or other information was revealed. On September 8, 2022, the name of the team was announced. On September 28, 2022, it was announced that the former Raiders Tirol quarterback and MVP for the 2022 European League of Football season, Sean Shelton, was appointed Director of Sport Operation.

Weblinks 

 Official website

References 

2022 establishments in Germany
American football teams in Germany
European League of Football teams
American football teams established in 2022
Sport in Munich